"The Wait" (original Spanish title: "La espera", sometimes translated as "The Waiting") is a 1950 short story by Argentine writer Jorge Luis Borges. It was published in the collection The Aleph. David Foster Wallace referred to the story as "marvelous".

References

Existentialist short stories
Short stories by Jorge Luis Borges
1950 short stories